Iqbal Butt (born 23 November 1956) is a Pakistani former first-class cricketer who played for Peshawar cricket team. He later became an umpire and stood in matches in the 2005–06 ABN-AMRO Twenty-20 Cup.

References

External links
 

1956 births
Living people
Pakistani cricketers
Pakistani cricket umpires
Peshawar cricketers
Cricketers from Peshawar